Marcel Barrington (born 28 August 1995) is a semi-professional footballer who plays as a forward for Herne Bay. Born in England, he represents the Guyana national football team.

Barrington began his career with Stoke City, and made his senior debut while on loan with Harrow Borough. He later joined Leicester City in January 2014, and featured for the Under-21s in between loan spells. Barrington represented both Nuneaton Town and Bishop's Stortford on short-term loans, before his release from the Foxes with the conclusion of the 2014–15 season.

The striker joined Walton Casuals in November 2015, before switching to league rivals Tooting & Mitcham United in January 2016. Barrington signed a contract Margate during the close season, but after a short loan spell with Grays Athletic, returned to his former side in December 2016. After a short spell back at Tooting & Mitcham, Barrington opted to join Hendon for the remainder of the campaign. Preceding the start of the 2017–18 campaign, Barrington was rewarded with a move to National League South side Braintree Town.

He is a Guyana international having made his debut in July 2015 in 2018 World Cup qualification.

Club career 
Barrington began his career with Stoke City, where he featured for the Under-18s. He then gained his first taste of senior football two days after his 18th birthday, joining Harrow Borough on loan. He completed 90 minutes just once in the one-month spell, and scored in the 3–1 victory over Dulwich Hamlet in September 2013.

He then swapped the Britannia Stadium for the King Power Stadium, joining Leicester City in January 2014, before having a brief loan spell with Ilkeston in the Northern Premier League. After returning to Leicester, Barrington initially joined up with the Under-18s, and headed into the Under-21s ahead of the 2014–15 season after signing a contract extension.

His next move came in November 2014, with the striker joining Nuneaton Town on a two-month loan. Once again, he scored a single goal in his temporary stay. Called up by manager Kevin Wilkin for his side's National League tie with Chester, Barrington grabbed Nuneaton's third goal to secure victory on his debut. He went on to make four more appearances for the non-League club, before being called back to represent Leicester's youth side during the loan spell.

Returning to Leicester with the conclusion of his loan in late January, he spent two months with the Foxes before signing for Bishop's Stortford. Barrington managed just four appearances for the club and failed to find the net in two months. He remained at the club until the end of the season, and was subsequently released the day after Nigel Pearson's departure as manager. He made a total of 12 appearances in the Under-21 Premier League.

Jamaal Shabazz soon rewarded Barrington with an international call-up, and he made his debut for Guyana on 15 June 2015 in a World Cup Qualifier. Playing in the final 18 minutes, he was cautioned in the final moments of the game in a 4–4 draw with St. Vincent and the Grenadines having replaced Trayon Bobb.

Barrington began the 2015–16 season without a club, despite having featured for Charlton Athletic on trial during pre-season friendlies. He eventually joined Isthmian Division One South club Walton Casuals in November 2015, where he scored one goal in eight appearances. Making his debut in a 3–2 defeat to Tooting & Mitcham United, he scored his side's only goal three weeks later in a 1–1 draw with Faversham Town. His final appearance for the club come in early December, and he was released shortly after.

Barrington was without a club for six weeks after his departure from the Moatside Stadium, but soon returned to action in the Isthmian Division One South with Tooting & Mitcham United in mid-January. He scored one goal in 16 appearances for the club in all competitions. On 8 March 2016, he received a call-up to the Guyana national squad ahead of the country's participation in the 2017 Caribbean Cup qualification. Barrington scored his first international goal in Guyana's opening fixture on 22 March 2016, concluding the scoring in a 7–0 victory over Anguilla after coming off the bench.

On 22 July 2016, Barrington signed for National League South side Margate. After impressing for the club during a pre-season trial, which saw him score five goals in two games, he was rewarded with a one-year deal. Barrington joined Isthmian League Premier Division club Grays Athletic on loan on 8 September 2016. Due to budget constraints, he was released in December 2016.

On 9 December 2016, Barrington returned to former club Tooting & Mitcham United for a second spell. After a short one-month spell at Tooting & Mitcham, Barrington opted to join fellow Isthmian League side Hendon. Barrington went onto feature twenty-one times for Hendon, scoring four goals before leaving to join National League South side Braintree Town in August 2017. He went onto make his Braintree debut during their 2–0 home victory over Chippenham Town, replacing Karl Oliyide in the 80th minute. 

In September 2020, he joined National League South side Welling United. Before that, he had a brief spell at Staines Town. In May 2021, Barrington moved to Cray Valley Paper Mills, scoring 22 goals in 42 appearances in all competitions. He subsequently joined Herne Bay in 2022.

International career 
Barrington registered his first cap for Guyana in their 2018 FIFA World Cup qualification (CONCACAF) fixture against Saint Vincent and the Grenadines, replacing Trayon Bobb in the 72nd minute during the 4–4 draw.

Career statistics

Club

International 
Scores and results list Guyana's goal tally first.

References

External links 

1995 births
Living people
Footballers from Greater London
Association football forwards
Guyanese footballers
Guyana international footballers
English footballers
English people of Guyanese descent
Stoke City F.C. players
Harrow Borough F.C. players
Leicester City F.C. players
Ilkeston F.C. players
Nuneaton Borough F.C. players
Bishop's Stortford F.C. players
Walton Casuals F.C. players
Tooting & Mitcham United F.C. players
Margate F.C. players
Grays Athletic F.C. players
Hendon F.C. players
Braintree Town F.C. players
Welling United F.C. players
Hampton & Richmond Borough F.C. players
Concord Rangers F.C. players
Dartford F.C. players
Staines Town F.C. players
Cray Valley Paper Mills F.C. players
Herne Bay F.C. players
National League (English football) players
Isthmian League players
Black British sportspeople